Frances Bay was a Canadian-American character actress

It may also refer to:

Places
 Frances Bay, a bay of Northern Territory, Australia
 Frances Bay, a bay of British Columbia, Canada
 Frances Bay, a bay of Minnesota, U.S.